Paltemio Barbetti (born 25 October 1989 in Rome, Italy) is an Italian footballer. He plays as a midfielder. He is currently playing for the Polisportiva Monti Cimini in the Eccellenza laziale in Italy.

Club career

Paltemio Barbetti signed his first professional footballing contract with Cisco Roma at the age of 18 making just one appearance in his first season.
On 2 July 2013, he debuted in Europe, in the Europa League between the Sliema Wanderers and the Khazar Lankaran and finished 1–1.

External links
 Career profile by tuttocalciatori.net

1989 births
Italian footballers
Living people
Pol. Monterotondo Lupa players
Sliema Wanderers F.C. players
Żebbuġ Rangers F.C. players
Pembroke Athleta F.C. players
Association football midfielders